John Simpson  (born 23 March 1958) is a British nuclear physicist. He is known for his work in gamma-ray spectroscopy and detector design. He was Head of Technology, Division of Technology Department. and was Head of the Nuclear Physics Group at STFC Daresbury Laboratory. He is a visiting professor of physics at the University of Liverpool. 

Simpson was educated at University of Liverpool (BSc(Hons) Physics Class 1, 1979) and the University of Liverpool (PhD, 1983).

In 2016 he was awarded the Ernest Rutherford Medal and Prize by the Institute of Physics. The award recognizes distinguished research in nuclear physics or nuclear technology. The award citation reads, "For his outstanding leadership in the development of new detector technologies and systems for experimental nuclear physics research within the UK and Europe, and for his seminal contributions to our understanding of the structure of atomic nuclei, especially in revealing new properties of nuclei at the limits of angular momentum, deformation, and stability".

An invited Open Access comment to a special Physica Scripta Focus issue celebrating the 40 year anniversary of the 1975 Nobel Prize in Physics to Aage Bohr, Ben Roy Mottelson and Leo Rainwater edited by Jerzy Dudek, outlines selected highlights from experimental investigations at the Niels Bohr Institute, Denmark, and Daresbury Laboratory, UK, in the late 1970s and early 1980s, many of which have continued at other national laboratories in Europe and the US to the present day.

References

External links
STFC Daresbury Laboratory
Niels Bohr Institute 
AGATA: The Advanced Gamma Tracking Array  

1958 births
Living people
Alumni of the University of Liverpool
Fellows of the Institute of Physics
Academics of the University of Liverpool